The DNA Learning Center (DNALC) is a genetics learning center affiliated with the Cold Spring Harbor Laboratory, in Cold Spring Harbor, New York.  It is the world's first science center devoted entirely to genetics education and offers online education, class field trips, student summer day camps, and teacher training. The DNALC's family of internet sites cover broad topics including basic heredity, genetic disorders, eugenics, the discovery of the structure of DNA, DNA sequencing, cancer, neuroscience, and plant genetics.

The center developed a website called DNA Subway for the iPlant Collaborative.

See also
 National Centre for Biotechnology Education, UK

References

External links 
 DNA Learning Center home

Education in New York (state)
Genetics education
Huntington, New York
Museums in Suffolk County, New York
Science education in the United States
Science museums in New York (state)